Brigitte Graune (born 14 March 1961) is a retired West German javelin thrower. Her personal best throw was 64.94 metres with the old javelin type, achieved in July 1989 in Dortmund.

She won the bronze medal at the 1987 Summer Universiade, won the silver medal at the 1989 Summer Universiade and finished eleventh at the 1990 European Championships.

She became West German champion in 1989 and 1990. She represented the clubs ASV Köln and LG Bayer Leverkusen.

References

Living people
1961 births
West German female javelin throwers
ASV Köln athletes
LG Bayer Leverkusen athletes
Universiade medalists in athletics (track and field)
Universiade silver medalists for West Germany
Universiade bronze medalists for West Germany
Medalists at the 1987 Summer Universiade
Medalists at the 1989 Summer Universiade